The Morocco Tennis Tour – Meknes was a professional tennis tournament played on outdoor red clay courts. It was currently part of the Association of Tennis Professionals (ATP) Challenger Tour. It was held annually in Meknes, Morocco, since 2008.

Past finals

Singles

Doubles

External links
Official website

 
ATP Challenger Tour
Clay court tennis tournaments
Tennis tournaments in Morocco
Sport in Meknes
Recurring sporting events established in 2008